Timothy Donald Cook (born November 1, 1960) is an American business executive who has been the chief executive officer of Apple Inc. since 2011. Cook previously served as the company's chief operating officer under its co-founder Steve Jobs.

Cook joined Apple in March 1998 as a senior vice president for worldwide operations, and then served as the executive vice president for worldwide sales and operations. He was made the chief executive on August 24, 2011, prior to Jobs' death in October of that year. During his tenure as the chief executive, he has advocated for the political reformation of international and domestic surveillance, cybersecurity, American manufacturing, and environmental preservation. Since 2011 when he took over Apple, to 2020, Cook doubled the company's revenue and profit, and the company's market value increased from $348 billion to $1.9 trillion.

In 2014, Cook became the first chief executive of a Fortune 500 company to publicly come out as gay. Cook also serves on the boards of directors of Nike, Inc. and the National Football Foundation; he is a trustee of Duke University, his alma mater. Outside of Apple, Cook engages in philanthropy, and in March 2015, he said he planned to donate his fortune to charity.

Early life and education
Cook was born in Mobile, Alabama, United States. He was baptized in a Baptist church and grew up in nearby Robertsdale. His father, Donald, was a shipyard worker, and his mother, Geraldine, worked at a pharmacy.

Cook graduated from Robertsdale High School in Alabama in 1978. He received a Bachelor of Science degree with a major in industrial engineering from Auburn University in 1982 and a Master of Business Administration from Duke University in 1988.

Career

Pre-Apple era
After graduating from Auburn University, Cook spent 12 years in IBM's personal computer business, ultimately serving as the director of North American fulfillment. During this time, Cook also earned his MBA from Duke University, becoming a Fuqua Scholar in 1988. Later, he served as the chief operating officer of the computer reseller division of Intelligent Electronics. In 1997, he became the vice president for corporate materials at Compaq for six months, but left the position after being hired by Steve Jobs.

Apple era

Early career
In 1998, Steve Jobs asked Cook to join Apple. In a commencement speech at Auburn University, Cook said he decided to join Apple after meeting Jobs:

His first position was senior vice president for worldwide operations. Cook closed factories and warehouses, and replaced them with contract manufacturers; this resulted in a reduction of the company's inventory from months to days. Predicting its importance, his group had invested in long-term deals such as advance investment in flash memory since 2005. This guaranteed a stable supply of what became the iPod Nano, then iPhone and iPad. Competitors at Hewlett-Packard described their cancelled HP TouchPad tablet computer and later said that it was made from "cast-off, reject iPad parts". Cook's actions were recognized for keeping costs under control, and combined with the rest of the company, generated huge profits.

In January 2007, Cook was promoted to lead operations and served as chief executive in 2009, while Jobs was away on a leave of absence for health-related issues. In January 2011, Apple's board of directors approved a third medical leave of absence requested by Jobs. During that time, Cook was responsible for most of Apple's day-to-day operations, while Jobs made most major decisions.

Apple chief executive (2011–present)
After Jobs resigned as CEO and became chairman of the board, Cook was named the new chief executive officer of Apple Inc. on August 24, 2011. Six weeks later, on October 5, 2011, Jobs died due to complications from pancreatic cancer. Forbes contributor Robin Ferracone wrote in September 2011: "Jobs and Cook proceeded to forge a strong partnership, and rescued the company from its death spiral, which took it from $11 billion in revenue in 1995 down to less than $6 billion in 1998 ... Under their leadership, the company went from its nadir to a remarkable $100 billion today". In April 2012, Time included Cook on its annual "100 Most Influential People in the World" list.

On October 29, 2012, Cook made major changes to the company's executive team. Scott Forstall resigned as senior vice president of iOS after the poorly received launch of Apple Maps, and became an advisor to Cook until he eventually departed from the company in 2013. John Browett, who was senior VP of retail, was dismissed six months after he commenced at Apple, when he received 100,000 shares worth US$60 million. Forstall's duties were divided among four other Apple executives: design SVP Jony Ive assumed leadership of Apple's human interface team; Craig Federighi became the new head of iOS software engineering; services chief Eddy Cue became responsible for Maps and Siri; and Bob Mansfield, previously SVP of hardware engineering, became the head of a new technology group.

Cook made the executive changes after the third quarter of the fiscal year, when revenues and profits grew less than predicted. Forstall's resignation was widely seen as a dismissal, allegedly caused by Cook's desire to reduce "rivalries between executives"; and drew criticism, as Forstall had been seen as a possible successor to Cook. On February 28, 2014, Cook made headlines when he challenged shareholders to "get out of the stock" if they did not share the company's views on sustainability and climate change. In May 2016, Cook traveled to China to meet with government officials there after the closure of Apple's online iTunes Store and Apple Books store by the Chinese government.

In 2016 some analysts compared Cook to former Microsoft CEO Steve Ballmer, claiming that innovation had died down since he replaced Jobs, similar to when Ballmer became Microsoft CEO in 2000. In December 2017, Cook was a speaker at the World Internet Conference in China.

Cook was appointed chairman of the advisory board for Tsinghua University's economics school in October 2019 for a three-year term.

Rep. Tom Malinowski, Rep. Alexandria Ocasio-Cortez, and several other lawmakers criticized Cook over Apple's decision to remove an app used by pro-democracy protesters in Hong Kong from its App Store. They accused Apple of censorship and co-signed a letter to Cook that read, "Apple's decisions last week to accommodate the Chinese government by taking down HKMaps is deeply concerning. We urge you in the strongest terms to reverse course, to demonstrate that Apple puts values above market access, and to stand with the brave men and women fighting for basic rights and dignity in Hong Kong." Cook explained in an internal letter why the company removed Hong Kong mapping app used by protesters to coordinate movements. In 2016, Cook signed a $275 billion deal with Chinese officials. The deal - personally negotiated by Cook - paved the way for increased censorship by Apple in China, for example the removal of Muslim content, preventing users from entering numbers that refer to the date of the Tiananmen Square Massacre, censoring Chinese words like "human rights" or "democracy", and manipulating Apple Maps to support China in the Senkaku Islands dispute by making Chinese-claimed islands appear larger than they actually are.

In August 2021, Cook received an approximate $750m payout, selling more than five million shares in Apple, after marking ten years in the job.

Cyber security
Alongside Google Vice President Vint Cerf and AT&T CEO Randall Stephenson, Cook attended a summit held by President Barack Obama on August 8, 2013, in regard to government surveillance and the Internet in the wake of the Edward Snowden NSA incident.

Following the December 2015 terrorist attack in San Bernardino, California, in which 14 people were killed by Rizwan Farook and Tashfeen Malik, the Federal Bureau of Investigation solicited Apple to assist in "unlock[ing]" an iPhone 5C used by Farook. On February 16, 2016, in response to a request by the Department of Justice, a federal magistrate judge ordered Apple to create a custom iOS firmware version that would allow investigators to circumvent the phone's security features. Cook responded in an open letter, wherein he denounced the government's demands as constituting a "breach of privacy" with "chilling" consequences.

Public image

Leadership style 
As Apple Inc. CEO, Cook regularly begins sending emails at 4:30 am each weekday and in the past held Sunday-night staff meetings by telephone to prepare for the next week. Cook shared in May 2013 that his leadership focused on people, strategy, and execution; he explained, "If you get those three right the world is a great place." Under Cook's leadership, Apple has increased its donations to charity, and in 2013, he hired Lisa Jackson, formerly the head of the Environmental Protection Agency, to assist Apple with the development of its renewable energy activities. Since becoming CEO, Cook has replaced Steve Jobs's micromanagement with a more hands-off style, and implemented a more collaborative culture at Apple.

Public affiliations

During the 2008 election cycle, Cook donated to Barack Obama's first White House election.

While it had been reported in early 2011 that Cook was gay, at the time, and prior to his Oct. 2014 public statement, Cook chose to keep his personal life private. He did publicly support LGBT rights. In October 2014, the Alabama Academy of Honor inducted Cook, who spoke about his home state's record of lesbian, gay, bisexual, and transgender rights. The Academy of Honor is the highest honor Alabama gives its citizens.

In 2015, Cook said he donated to Democratic Senators Chuck Schumer and Patrick Leahy for their stances on eBook pricing and surveillance reform, respectively. During the same election cycle, he hosted a fundraiser for Republican Senator Rob Portman.

In early March 2016, Cook disclosed that he donated to the election campaign of Democratic Rep. Zoe Lofgren of California. In early June, Cook hosted a private fundraiser along with then Speaker of the U.S. House of Representatives Paul Ryan. The event was described by Politico as "a joint fundraising committee aimed at helping to elect other House Republicans".

In the 2016 election, Cook raised funds for the presidential campaign of Hillary Clinton. At one point, Clinton's campaign considered Cook as a candidate for Vice President.

In September 2017 at Bloomberg's Global Business Forum, Cook defended the DACA immigration program. He expressed his dissatisfaction with the direction of Donald Trump's administration, stating: "This is unacceptable. This is not who we are as a country. I am personally shocked that there is even a discussion of this."

In 2018, at a privacy conference in Brussels, Cook expressed his opinions on the stockpiling of personal data by tech firms, suggesting that it amounted to surveillance and should make the public "very uncomfortable."

In a meeting for the American Workforce Policy Advisory Board with President Donald Trump in March 2019, Trump referred to Cook as "Tim Apple". Cook leaned into the slip-up by changing his display name on Twitter to Tim Apple while Trump denied that he had said it.

Personal life
Cook is a fitness enthusiast and enjoys hiking, cycling, and going to the gym. He is known for being solitary, using an off-campus fitness center for privacy, and little is publicly shared about his personal life. He explained in October 2014 that he has sought to achieve a "basic level of privacy".

Cook was misdiagnosed with multiple sclerosis in 1996, an incident he said made him "see the world in a different way". He has since taken part in charity fundraising, such as cycle races to raise money for the disease. He later told the Auburn alumni magazine that his symptoms came from "lugging a lot of incredibly heavy luggage around".

Cook has said that in 2009 he offered a portion of his liver to Jobs, as they shared a rare blood type. Cook said that Jobs responded by yelling, "I'll never let you do that. I'll never do that."

While delivering the 2010 commencement speech at Auburn, Cook emphasized the importance of intuition during significant decision-making processes, and explained that preparation and hard work are also necessary to execute on intuition.

In June 2014, Cook attended San Francisco's gay pride parade along with a delegation of Apple staff. On October 30, Cook publicly came out as gay in an editorial for Bloomberg Business, saying, "I'm proud to be gay, and I consider being gay among the greatest gifts God has given me." He consulted with Anderson Cooper, who had publicly come out himself, on aspects of the statement, and cleared the timing to ensure it would not distract from business interests. Cook had been open about his sexuality "for years", and while many people at the company were aware of his sexual orientation, he sought to focus on Apple's products and customers rather than his personal life. He ended his op-ed by writing, "We pave the sunlit path toward justice together, brick by brick. This is my brick." Cook became the first and only openly gay CEO on the Fortune 500 list. In September 2015, Cook clarified on The Late Show with Stephen Colbert, "Where I valued my privacy significantly, I felt that I was valuing it too far above what I could do for other people, so I wanted to tell everyone my truth." In October 2019, he talked about the decision and remarked on how it was thanks to LGBTQ people who had fought for their rights before him that paved the way for his success, and that he needed to let younger generations know that—in a coding analogy—he saw being gay as a feature his life had to offer rather than any problem. He hoped his openness could help LGBTQ youth dealing with homelessness and suicide hope that their situation could get better.

In 2021, Cook appeared on the Time 100, Times annual list of the 100 most influential people in the world.

Awards and honors 
 Financial Times Person of the Year (2014)
 Ripple of Change Award (2015)
 Fortune's World's Greatest Leader (2015)
 Alabama Academy of Honor: Inductee (2015)
 Human Rights Campaign's Visibility Award (2015)
 Honorary Doctor of Science from University of Glasgow in Glasgow, Scotland (2017)
Courage Against Hate award from Anti-Defamation League (2018)
 Honorary Master’s degree in Innovation and International Management from University of Naples Federico II in Naples, Italy (2022)

References

External links

 
 Apple.com bio
 Forbes Profile

1960 births
20th-century American businesspeople
21st-century American businesspeople
American chief operating officers
American computer businesspeople
American technology chief executives
Apple Inc. executives
Auburn University alumni
Fuqua School of Business alumni
IBM employees
American LGBT businesspeople
LGBT people from Alabama
Living people
Nike, Inc. people
People from Robertsdale, Alabama
Directors of Apple Inc.
National Football League executives
Duke University trustees
American billionaires
American chief executives of Fortune 500 companies